Marilou Horlina Cayco is a Filipina politician from Batanes island in the Philippines, and currently the Governor of Batanes. She has been elected two terms as Governor of Batanes. She first won election to Governor in 2016 and was re-elected in 2019.

References

External links
Province of Batanes Official Website

Living people
21st-century Filipino politicians
Governors of Batanes
Liberal Party (Philippines) politicians
Year of birth missing (living people)